Charlie Stubbs may refer to:

 Charlie Stubbs (Coronation Street), a character on the British soap opera Coronation Street
 Charlie Stubbs (American football) (born 1955), current head football coach at Nicholls State University
 Charlie Stubbs (footballer) (1920–1984), English footballer